The Banner Lassen Medical Center is a 25-bed community hospital in Susanville, California, United States.

History
The hospital originally opened in 1883 as Lassen County Hospital. Lutheran Health System assumed management in 1994 and purchased the hospital from St. Mary's Hospital in 1999. Lutheran Health System later merged with Samaritan Health and became Banner Health. The current facility north of town opened in May 2003.

See also
 List of hospitals in California

References

External links
 
 This hospital in the CA Healthcare Atlas A project by OSHPD

Hospital buildings completed in 2003
Hospitals in California
Buildings and structures in Lassen County, California
Trauma centers
1883 establishments in California